Rich Girl(s) may refer to:
 Rich Girl (album), an album by Angie Stone
 "Rich Girl" (Hall & Oates song), 1977
 "Rich Girl" (Gwen Stefani song), 2004
 "Rich Girl", a song by Louchie Lou & Michie One from their album II Be Free
 "Rich Girl", a song by Soulja Boy, from the album The DeAndre Way
 Rich Girl (film), a 1991 film
 RichGirl, an American R&B girl group
 Rich Girls, TV series
 Rich Girls (mixtape),  a 2008 mixtape by rap duo Shwayze
 "Rich Girls" (song), a song by Down With Webster released in 2009 on their album Time to Win, Vol. 1
 Rich Girl (play), a play by Victoria Stewart